Rosiloa (previously known as Black Rose) is a Fijian music band, currently signed by the New-Caledonian music label "Mangrove Productions".

After releasing several covers albums locally, they released their first original album, Voices of Nature, in 2000 and the single Raude. Raude is a mix between a traditional Fijian music form called "meke", and modern dance rhythms and sounds, brought in by David LE ROY, producer and co-founder of the 2001 French dance act Daddy DJ.  Voices of Nature was followed by Black Rose's second album, Kila...?, in 2002. It was followed in 2005 by their first best-of album Rosiloa, which featured a new song, as well as unreleased remixes and video footage from the making of Kila...?. The band's latest effort is titled Ancient Pulse. It was released in 2009.

Discography 
2000 - Voices of Nature (album)
2002 - Kila...? (album)
2005 - Rosiloa (best-of album)
2009 - Ancient Pulse (album)

Line Up
Timoci(Jim) Ratusila, from Ra, Vocals/Guitars
Peter Chong, from Tailevu, Keyboards/Hitek
Sirilo (Siri) and (Jo) Daurewa, from Narauyaba, Ra province, Drums/Vocals
Paulo (Pa) Daurewa, from Narauyaba, Ra, Guitars/Perc/Vocals
Apisai (Bis) Naulivou from Nanoko, Nadroga, Keyboards/ Vocals
Robert (Junior) Dass, from Naqau, Sigatoka, Bass Guitar
Seniyaro (Yaro) Matakiviwa, from Ra, Traditional Dancer/ Vocals
Ratu Joseva (Tugata) Banivalu, from Soso, Naceva, Kadavu, Meke/Dance/Vox
Peter Cahill from Aotearoa/Nadi, Tour Manager/Sound Engineer
 Joe Vimosoi from Navuatu, Kadavu, Percussion/vocals

Notes

References
Rosiloa Website

Fijian music